Thomas Yates Benyon, OBE (born 13 August 1942, Newmarket, West Suffolk) is a British activist and former Conservative Party politician.

Early life
Benyon was educated at Wellington School, Somerset from 1956 to 1960.

Parliamentary career
Benyon twice stood unsuccessfully for Parliament in Labour-held seats. In February 1974 he contested Huyton in Merseyside against the former (and future) Prime Minister, Harold Wilson. In the following election in October that year, he contested Wood Green in London but was again beaten, this time by the Labour incumbent Joyce Butler.

Following the murder of Airey Neave just before the 1979 general election, Benyon became the new candidate to be Member of Parliament (MP) for the Conservative stronghold of Abingdon, which he won with ease. However, in 1983, the seat was abolished in boundary changes, and Benyon did not stand for the Oxford West & Abingdon or Wantage seats that replaced it. He has not stood for Parliament since.

Other work
He was on the governing body of Abingdon School from 1979 to 1983.

In 2002, Tom and Olivia Jane Benyon, with James Pringle, Sue Gibbs, Clare Hayns, James Maberly and the Rev David Streater, founded a charity called ZANE. It was spearheaded by Tom Benyon after he met Cathy Olds whose husband Martin was hacked to death in Zimbabwe the previous year, in 2001, when their farm was occupied by Robert Mugabe loyalists.

In 2005 he was elected for a five-year term, as a lay representative of the Diocese of Oxford, to the General Synod of the Church of England. He remains an active member of the Church.

Honours
Benyon was awarded the OBE in recognition of his "services to vulnerable people in Zimbabwe".

References

Times Guide to the House of Commons, 1979 & 1983

External links
 

1942 births
Living people
People from Newmarket, Suffolk
Conservative Party (UK) MPs for English constituencies
UK MPs 1979–1983
British activists
British Anglicans
British humanitarians
Officers of the Order of the British Empire
People educated at Wellington School, Somerset
Governors of Abingdon School